Engin Akyürek (born 12 October 1981) is a Turkish actor, screenwriter and author. Akyürek began his acting career in the year 2004. Having starred in many acclaimed series and movies, Akyürek is considered as one of Turkey's most successful and highest paid actors. 

Akyürek received no official schooling for acting, stage or screen. Yet, he had a passion for writing and drama. He graduated from the history department of the language-history and geography faculty at Ankara University before he took part in the Türkiye'nin Yıldızları (Turkey's Stars) TV contest for acting. He was one of the stars of the contest alongside Beren Saat, who went on to become one of the most famous actresses of Turkish TV dramas. He received his first leading role in Bir Bulut Olsam, in which he played the role of Mustafa Bulut. His spectacular portrayal of the character bought the series into attention of audience.

Engin Akyürek is well known for portraying many lead roles in TV series, such as Kerim Ilgaz in Fatmagül'ün Suçu Ne?, Ömer Demir in Kara Para Aşk, and Sancar in Sefirin Kızı. His role as Ömer in Kara Para Aşk led to him winning the best actor award in Seoul International Drama Awards (2015) and a nomination for best performance by an actor at the International Emmy Awards.

Apart from television, Akyürek has also starred in movies. His debut film was Kader, in which he starred as Cevat. He also played the role of Tekin in the film Bi Küçük Eylül Meselesi, written and directed by Kerem Deren. He is also the brand ambassador of Shell and Disney+ Türkiye.

Early life and education
Engin Akyürek was born on 12 October 1981 in Ankara, Turkey. His family is from Tercan, Erzincan, Turkey. His father is a government official and his mother is a homemaker. He has a younger brother. Akyürek graduated from the Ankara University Department of History in 2002, where he had expertise in languages and history.

Acting career

In 2004, two years after graduating from university, Engin Akyürek took part in the Turkiye’nin Yildizlari (Turkey's Star) TV competition. His first place win in this competition landed him a supporting role in the TV series, Yabancı Damat (2004–2007), produced by Yagmur Taylan and Durul Taylan. In Yabancı Damat, he worked with many cinema and stage veterans like Erdal Özyağcılar and Zeki Alasya along with young stars such as İlker Aksum and Binnur Kaya. He appeared in all 106 episodes of the show becoming a regular face for TV spectators. The TV series became popular in Greece as well, reflecting the warm Turkish-European relations at that time. The show began in 2004 and made its finale in 2007. His first film debut was Zeki Demirkubuz's Kader (2006). For his portrayal of Cevat in this film, Engin Akyürek received the "Most Promising Actor" award for both the Turkish Cinema Awards and for CASOD (Cagdas Sinema Oyuncuları Dernegi) Awards in 2006. Thereafter, he starred in the role of Nizipli Halim in the TV series, Karayilan (2007–2008), a story that took place in Gaziantep, during the French Occupation. Akyürek received his first leading role and played the male psychotic lover, Mustafa Bulut, in the Kanal D TV series Bir Bulut Olsam, written by Meral Okay and directed by Ulaş İnanc. His spectacular portrayal of the character brought the series into limelight. 

From 2010 to 2012, Akyürek solidified his position in the industry when he played the male lead, Kerim Ilgaz, in Fatmagül'ün Suçu Ne?, a TV series about societal issues surrounding a rape victim. The original scenario of Fatmagul'ün Suçu Ne? by Vedat Türkali, is written by Ece Yörenç and Melek Gençoğlu for TV drama and produced by Kerem Çatay. He was in the lead role with his friend from the Türkiye'nin Yıldızları contest, Beren Saat. After a small break, he came and starred  as the leading character, Tekin, in the movie Bi Küçük Eylül Meselesi (2014), written and directed by Kerem Deren. The movie takes place in Bozcaada. Thereafter, Akyürek returned to the TV screens and portrayed the character of Ömer Demir in the popular TV series Kara Para Aşk in 2014 for which he won the Best Actor award at the Seoul International Drama Awards (2015) and was nominated for the International Emmy Award for Best Actor. After Kara Para Aşk, Akyürek took a break from acting for some time and returned to small screen with his next series Ölene Kadar in January 2017. It was produced by TIMS and written by Elif Usman and Sevgi Yılmaz.

Akyürek's next projects were movies, first one being Çocuklar Sana Emanet (Children Entrusted to You) released on 23 March 2018. It was written and directed by Çağan Irmak and produced by Şükrü Avşar. Akyürek's next venture on the silver screen was the movie Bir Aşk İki Hayat (One Love Two Lives) in 2019. It was produced by Ay Yapım and written by Burcu Görgün Toptaş and Özlem Yılmaz, whereas Ali Bilgin did the direction. The movie was an adaptation of a Greek movie and was released on 13 February 2019. Between 2019-2021 Akyürek  to the small screen with his series Sefirin Kızı (The Ambassador's Daughter) from December 2019 to May 2021. The series was a joint production of O3 Medya and NGM and was aired on Star TV, and was written by Nehir Erdem and Ayşe Ferda Eryılmaz and directed by Emre Kabakuşak. He starred in the series with Neslihan Atagül and subsequently Tuba Büyüküstün after Atagül left the show due to health reasons. This was his second series with Büyüküstün. 

In 2022, Akyürek starred alongside Tolga Sarıtaş in the film Yolun Açik Olsun (Godspeed), directed by Mehmet Ada Öztekin and released on Netflix. Akyürek made his OTT debut by starring in the debuting Disney+'s series Kaçış, in the lead role opposite İrem Helvacıoğlu. The story of the series was written by Akyürek himself. The first season received positive reviews from critics, and Akyürek received critical acclaim for both his acting and for writing the story of the series. As of 2023, he has a leading role in the series Adım Farah with Demet Özdemir.

Filmography

Film

TV series

Theatre

Awards and nominations

Bibliography

References

1981 births
Living people
Turkish Muslims
Turkish male film actors
Turkish male television actors
Male actors from Ankara
Ankara University alumni